Psychotria whistleri, the Rarotonga psychotria, is a herbaceous plant, a member of the Rubiaceae family.

Description 
It is a small shrub, 2 meters high.

Distribution 
It is an endemic species to Cook Islands.

Taxonomy 
It was named by Francis Fosberg, in Micronesica 23: 3 in 1990.

References 

whistleri